Peter Goalby (born 13 July 1950) is an English singer and guitarist. He was the lead vocalist for Uriah Heep between 1982 and 1986, recording three albums with the band. He also wrote Blood Red Roses, recorded by the band for their 1989 album Raging Silence and released as the second single from the album.

Before singing for Uriah Heep, he was lead singer and second guitarist in Trapeze on the studio recording Hold On (1978) and the live album Live in Texas: Dead Armadillos (1981). He also plays mandolin.

Discography

Fable
Fable (1973)
See My Face b/w Thick as a Plank (1973)
Motorbike b/w Gotta Getaway (1973)

Solo
As Peter Goalby
Ain't it Funny b/w Shirt on a Loser (1975)
You are Day, You are Night b/w Captain's Log (1975)
Peter Goalby (1990) – Only album under this name, remains unreleased as of 2009.
Easy With The Heartaches (2021) - official CD of previously unreleased solo recordings

As Peter Goalby's Perfect Stranger
I Don't Wanna Fight b/w It's all Over Your Face (1988)

Trapeze
Hold On (1979)
Live in Texas: Dead Armadillos (1981)
On the Highwire (2003)

Uriah Heep
Abominog (1982)
Head First (1983)
Equator (1985)

The European Team
Sport Alive b/w Guitar Alive (1985)

Shy
Brave the Storm (1985) – Backing vocals

Tigertailz
Bezerk (1990) – Backing vocals

John Parr
Man with a Vision (1992) – Plays guitar

References

Uriah Heep (band) members
Trapeze (band) members
Musicians from the West Midlands (county)
Living people
English rock singers
English heavy metal singers
English male singers
musicians from Wolverhampton
1950 births